The Boys from Syracuse is a 1940 American musical film directed by A. Edward Sutherland, based on the 1938 stage musical by Richard Rodgers and Lorenz Hart, which in turn was loosely based on the play The Comedy of Errors by William Shakespeare. The film was nominated for two Academy Awards; one for Best Visual Effects (John P. Fulton, Bernard B. Brown, Joe Lapis) and one for Best Art Direction (Jack Otterson).

Plot

Cast

 Allan Jones as Antipholus of Ephesus and Antipholus of Syracuse
 Irene Hervey as Adriana
 Martha Raye as Luce
 Joe Penner as Dromio of Ephesus and Dromio of Syracuse
 Alan Mowbray as Angelo
 Charles Butterworth as Duke of Ephesus
 Rosemary Lane as Phyllis
 Samuel S. Hinds as Angeen
 Tom Dugan as Octavius
 Spencer Charters as Turnkey
 Doris Lloyd as Woman
 Larry J. Blake as Announcer
 Eddie Acuff as Taxi Cab Driver
 Matt McHugh as Bartender
 David Oliver as Messenger
 Bess Flowers as Woman
 Cyril Ring as Guard
 Julie Carter as Girl
 Eric Blore as Pinch
 William Desmond as Citizen (uncredited)

Reception
The film received mixed reviews from critics. Bosley Crowther of The New York Times called the film "a light-weight story of mistaken identities which brushes quickly over the more intriguing implications of bedroom farce and relies in the main for its humors upon familiar low-comedy mugging and anachronistic gags. Some of them are funny—the first two or three times, anyhow ... But a lot of modern slapstick and confusion only goes so far in ancient dress—and, in this case, it isn't far enough." Variety wrote, "Sophisticated audiences will find the gags too unsubtle and the action too obvious, but the greater part of the film audience will relish the out-and-out screwiness of the whole idea." Harrison's Reports wrote that the film "should, for the most part, prove satisfying to the masses, for it has plentiful gags, a few good songs, and romance." Film Daily called it "packed with laughs" and "definitely timely as escapist entertainment." In a review for The New Yorker, Sally Benson reported that the film had revived the stage musical "not very successfully." However, she wrote, "if you can stand seeing double, and don't mind hearing American slang in ancient Greece, and can even smile feebly over chariots equipped with taximeters, you may be able to totter out of your nearest air-cooled theater with a sultry sort of satisfaction."

References

External links

1940 films
1940 musical films
American musical films
American films based on plays
American black-and-white films
Films based on The Comedy of Errors
Films directed by A. Edward Sutherland
Universal Pictures films
Films set in classical antiquity
Films based on musicals
Films based on adaptations
Depictions of Augustus on film
1940s English-language films
1940s American films